Nasareth (named for the biblical Nazareth), is a hamlet in the Nantlle Valley in Gwynedd, Wales.

The Councillor for Nasareth is Owen Pennant Huws, which covers Llanllyfni and surrounding villages.

See also
Nazareth
Bethlehem, Carmarthenshire

References

External links

History and other related matters
www.geograph.co.uk : photos of Nasareth and surrounding area

Villages in Gwynedd
Llanllyfni